In economics, the Baumol effect, also known as Baumol's cost disease, is the rise of wages in jobs that have experienced little or no increase in labor productivity, in response to rising salaries in other jobs that have experienced higher productivity growth. The phenomenon was described by William J. Baumol and William G. Bowen in the 1960s and is an example of cross elasticity of demand.

The rise of wages in jobs without productivity gains derives from the requirement to compete for workers with jobs that have experienced productivity gains and so can naturally pay higher salaries, just as classical economics predicts. For instance, if the retail sector pays its managers low wages, they may decide to quit and get jobs in the automobile sector, where wages are higher because of higher labor productivity. Thus, retail managers' salaries increase not due to labor productivity increases in the retail sector,  but due to productivity and corresponding wage increases in other industries.

Description
Increases in labor productivity tend to result in higher wages. Productivity growth is not uniform across the economy, however. Some sectors experience high productivity growth while others experience little or negative productivity growth. Yet wages have tended to rise not only in sectors with high productivity growth but also in those with little to no productivity growth.

The American economists William J. Baumol and William G. Bowen proposed that wages in sectors with stagnant productivity rise out of the need to compete for workers with sectors that experience higher productivity growth, which can afford to raise wages without raising prices. With higher labor costs, but little increase in productivity, sectors with low productivity growth see their costs of production rise. As summarized by Baumol in a 1967 paper:
If productivity per man hour rises cumulatively in one sector relative to its rate of growth elsewhere in the economy, while wages rise commensurately in all areas, then relative costs in the nonprogressive sectors must inevitably rise, and these costs will rise cumulatively and without limit...Thus, the very progress of the technologically progressive sectors inevitably adds to the costs of the technologically unchanging sectors of the economy, unless somehow the labor markets in these areas can be sealed off and wages held absolutely constant, a most unlikely possibility.

Origins

Performing arts
The original study inspiring the concept of Baumol effect was conducted for the performing arts sector. American economists William J. Baumol and William G. Bowen pointed out that the same number of musicians is needed to play a Beethoven string quartet today as was needed in the 19th century—in other words, the productivity of classical music performance has not increased. However, the real wages of musicians have increased substantially since the 19th century.

Early references
The concept was alluded to as early as 1776 by Adam Smith in The Wealth of Nations:
Let us suppose, for example, that in the greater part of employments the productive powers of labour had been improved to tenfold, or that a day's labour could produce ten times the quantity of work which it had done originally; but that in a particular employment they had been improved only to double, or that a day's labour could produce only twice the quantity of work which it had done before. In exchanging the produce of a day's labour in the greater part of employments for that of a day's labour in this particular one, ten times the original quantity of work in them would purchase only twice the original quantity in it. Any particular quantity in it, therefore, a pound weight, for example, would appear to be five times dearer than before. In reality, however, it would be twice as cheap.

Effects

Macroeconomic effects

Price and output
Firms may respond to increases in labor costs induced by the Baumol effect in a variety of ways, including:
 Cost and price disease: Prices in stagnant industries tend to grow faster than average
 Stagnant output: Real output in low-productivity-growth industries tends to grow more slowly relative to the overall economy
 Employment effects: Firms in stagnant industries may reduce employment, decrease hours, or increase non-monetary compensation

A 2008 study by American economist William Nordhaus showed as much, concluding that "Baumol-type diseases" in technologically stagnant sectors have led to "rising relative prices and declining relative real outputs". In the realm of prices, Nordhaus showed that in the United States from 1948–2001 "productivity trends are associated almost percentage-point for percentage-point with price decline". Industries with low productivity growth thus saw their relative prices increase, leading Nordhaus to conclude: "The hypothesis of a cost-price disease due to slow productivity growth is strongly supported by the historical data. Industries with relatively lower productivity growth show a percentage-point
for percentage-point higher growth in relative prices." A similar conclusion held for real output: "The real output/stagnation hypothesis is
strongly confirmed. Technologically stagnant industries have shown slower growth in real output than have the technologically dynamic ones. A one percentage-point higher productivity growth was associated with a three-quarters percentage-point higher real output growth."

An important implication of Baumol effect is that it should be expected that, in a world with technological progress, the costs of manufactured goods will tend to fall (as productivity in manufacturing continually increases) while the costs of labor-intensive services like education, legal services, and health care (where productivity growth is persistently slow) will tend to rise (see chart).

Affordability
While Baumol effect suggests that costs in low-productivity-growth industries will continually rise, Baumol argues the "stagnant-sector services will never become unaffordable to society. This is because the economy's constantly growing productivity simultaneously increases the community's overall purchasing power." To see this, consider an economy with a real national income of $100 billion with healthcare spending amounting to $20 billion (20%), leaving $80 billion for other purchases. Say that, over 50 years, due to productivity growth real national income doubles to $200 billion (an annual growth rate of about 1.4%). To end up with the same amount of income left over after healthcare spending as 50 years prior, healthcare spending would have to rise by 500%, to $120 billion. In this situation, healthcare would no longer take up 20% of national income but fully 60%. If healthcare costs were to rise to anything less than 60% of national income, there would be more money left over for other purchases (for instance, if healthcare costs were to rise from 20% of national income to 40% of national income, there would be $120 billion left over for other purchases—40% more than 50 years prior). So it can be seen that even if productivity growth were to lead to substantial healthcare cost increases through Baumol's cost disease, the wealth increase brought on by that productivity growth would still leave society able to purchase more goods than before.

Government spending
Baumol effect has major implications for government spending. Since most government spending goes towards services that are subject to the cost disease—law enforcement, education, healthcare etc.—the cost to the government of providing these services will rise as time goes on.

Labor force distribution

One implication of the Baumol effect is a shift in the distribution of the labor force from high-productivity industries to low-productivity industries. In other words, the effect predicts that the share of the workforce employed in low-productivity industries will rise over time.

The reason for this can be seen through a thought experiment offered by Baumol in his book The Cost Disease: 
Let us assume for simplicity that the share of the economy's total output that comes from the progressive sector [industries with high productivity growth], as measured in physical units rather than money, does not change. Because the economy has only two sectors, progressive and stagnant [industries with low productivity growth], whose production together accounts for all of its output, it follows that the stagnant sector also must maintain a constant share of the total.

This has significant implications for the distribution of the economy's labor force. By definition, labor productivity grows significantly faster in the progressive sector than in the stagnant sector, so to keep a constant proportion between the two sectors' output, more and more labor has to move from the progressive sector into the stagnant sector.

As predicted by the Baumol effect, the proportion of the United States labor force employed in stagnant industries has grown substantially since the 1960s. In particular, the United States has morphed from a manufacturing economy into a service economy (see chart). However, how much of this is due to the Baumol effect rather than other causes is disputed. In a 2010 study, the economist Talan B. İşcan devised a model from which he concluded that both Baumol and Engel effects played significant roles in the rising share of employment in services in the United States (though he noted that "considerable gaps between the calibrated model and the actual data remain"). An older 1968 study by economist Victor Fuchs likewise concluded that the Baumol effect played a major role in the shift to services, although he determined that demand shifts like those proposed in Engel's law played only a minor role. The economists Robert Rowthorn and Ramana Ramaswamy also concluded that relatively faster growth of productivity in manufacturing played a role in the shift to services. The economist Tom Elfring, however, argued in a 1989 paper that the Baumol effect has played a secondary role to growth in demand for services since the 1970s. Alternative theories for the shift to services include demand-side theories (the Baumol effect is broadly a supply-side explanation) like the three-sector model devised by Allan Fisher and Colin Clark in the 1930s, which posit that services satisfy higher needs than goods and so as income grows a higher share of income will be used for the purchase of services; changes in the inter-industry division of labor, favoring specialized service activities; outsourcing to countries with lower labor costs; increasing participation of women in the labor force; and trade specialization.

The Baumol effect has also been used to describe the reallocation of labor out of agriculture (in 1930, 21.5% of the workforce was employed in agriculture and agriculture made up 7.7% of GDP; by 2000, only 1.9% of the workforce was employed in agriculture and agriculture made up only 0.7% of GDP). In a 2009 study, the economists Benjamin N. Dennis and Talan B. İşcan concluded that after the 1950s relatively faster productivity growth in agriculture was the key driver behind the continuing shift in employment from agriculture to non-farm goods (prior to the 1950s, they determined that Engel's law explained almost all labor reallocation out of agriculture).

Economic growth and aggregate productivity
In his original paper on the cost disease, Baumol argued that in the long run the cost disease implies a reduction in aggregate productivity growth and correspondingly a reduction in economic growth. This follows straightforwardly from the labor distribution effects of the cost disease. As a larger and larger share of the workforce moves from high-productivity-growth industries to low-productivity-growth industries, it is natural to expect that the overall rate of productivity growth will slow. Since economic growth is driven in large part by productivity growth, economic growth would also slow.

The economist Nicholas Oulton, however, argued in a 2001 paper that Baumol effect may counterintuitively result in an increase in aggregate productivity growth. This could occur if many services produce intermediate inputs for the manufacturing sector, i.e. if a significant number of services are business services. In this case, even though the slow-growth service sector is increasing in size, because these services further boost the productivity growth of the shrinking manufacturing sector overall productivity growth may actually increase. Relatedly, the economist Maurizio Pugno described how many stagnant services, like education and healthcare, contribute to human capital formation, which enhances growth and thus "oppos[es] the negative Baumol effect on growth".

The economist Hiroaki Sasaki, however, disputed Oulton's argument in a 2007 paper. Sasaki constructed an economic model that takes into account the use of services as intermediate inputs in high-productivity-growth industries and still concluded that a shift in labor force distribution from higher-productivity-growth manufacturing to lower-productivity-growth services decreases the rate of economic growth in the long run. Likewise, the economists Jochen Hartwig and Hagen Krämer concluded in a 2019 paper that, while Outlon's theory is "logically consistent", it is "not in line with the data", which shows a lowering of aggregate productivity growth.

Education
The Baumol effect has been applied to the education sector, including by Baumol himself. By most measures, productivity growth in the education sector over the last several decades has been low or even negative; the average student-teacher ratio in American universities, for instance, was sixteen to one in 2011, just as it was in 1981. Yet, over this period, tuition costs have risen substantially. It has been proposed that this is at least partially explained by the Baumol effect: even though there has been little or even negative productivity growth in the education sector, because of productivity increases across other sectors of the economy universities today would not be able to attract professors with 1980s-level salaries, so they are forced to raise wages to maintain their workforce. To afford the increased labor costs, universities raise tuition (i.e. they increase prices).

Evidence on the role of the Baumol effect in rising education costs has been mixed. Economists Robert B. Archibald and David H. Feldman, both of the College of William & Mary, argued in a 2006 study, for instance, that the Baumol effect is the dominant driver behind increasing higher education costs. Other studies, however, have found a lesser role for the Baumol effect. In a 2014 study, the economists Robert E. Martin and Carter Hill devised a model that determined that the Baumol effect explained only 23%–32% of the rise in higher education costs. The economists Gary Rhoades and Joanna Frye went further in a 2015 study and argued that the Baumol effect could not explain rising tuition costs at all, as "relative academic labor costs have gone down as tuition has gone up". The cost disease may also have only limited effects on primary and secondary education: a 2016 study on per-pupil public education spending by Manabu Nose, an economist at the International Monetary Fund, found that "the contribution of Baumol's effect was much smaller than implied by theory"; Nose argued that it was instead rising wage premiums paid for teachers in excess of market wages that were the dominant reason for increasing costs, particularly in developing countries.

Alternative explanations for rising higher education costs include Bowen's revenue theory of cost, reduced public subsidies for education, administrative bloat, the commercialization of higher education, increased demand for higher education, the easy availability of federal student loans, difficulty comparing prices of different universities, technological change, and lack of a central mechanism to control price increases.

Healthcare
The Baumol effect has been applied to the rising cost of healthcare, as the healthcare industry has long had low productivity growth. Empirical studies have largely confirmed the large role of the Baumol effect in the rising cost of healthcare in the United States, although there is some disagreement. Likewise, a 2021 study determined that "Baumol's cost disease ha[s] a significant positive impact on health expenditure growth" in China. However, a paper by economists Bradley Rossen and Akhter Faroque on healthcare costs in Canada found that "the cost disease...is a relatively minor contributor [in the growth of health-care spending in Canada], while technical progress in health care and growth in per capita incomes are by far the biggest contributors".

Despite substantial technological innovation and capital investment, the healthcare industry has struggled to significantly increase productivity. As summarized by the economists Alberto Marino, David Morgan, Luca Lorenzoni, and Chris James:
"Technological advancements, capital investments and economies of scale do not make for a cumulative rise in output that is on par with progressive sectors of the economy...[A]utomation and better technology generally do not allow for large productivity increases. A health professional is difficult to substitute, in particular by using new technologies, which may actually also bring an increase in volume (e.g. faster diagnostic tests). Increases in volume likely brought about by new technology will also drive up expenditure, since new health professionals will have to be hired to treat everyone. Moreover, new technologies require more specialised training for say [sic] doctors, driving wages up further since more years of experience are required."

Service industry
Baumol's cost disease is often used to describe consequences of the lack of growth in productivity in the quaternary sector of the economy and public services, such as public hospitals and state colleges. Labor-intensive sectors that rely heavily on non-routine human interaction or activities, such as health care, education, or the performing arts, have had less growth in productivity over time. As with the string quartet example, it takes nurses the same amount of time to change a bandage or college professors the same amount of time to mark an essay today as it did in 1966, as those types of activities rely on the movements of the human body, which cannot yet be engineered to perform more quickly, accurately, or efficiently in the same way that a machine, such as a computer, have. In contrast, goods-producing industries, such as the car manufacturing sector and other activities that involve routine tasks, workers are continually becoming more productive by technological innovations to their tools and equipment.

The reported productivity gains of the service industry in the late 1990s are largely attributable to total factor productivity. Providers decreased the cost of ancillary labor through outsourcing or technology. Examples include offshoring data entry and bookkeeping for health care providers and replacing manually-marked essays in educational assessment with multiple choice tests that can be automatically marked.

Technical description
In the 1967 paper Macroeconomics of Unbalanced Growth: The Anatomy of Urban Crisis, Baumol introduced a simple two-sector model to demonstrate the cost disease. To do so, he imagined an economy consisting of only two sectors: sector one, which has constant productivity (that is, the number of goods workers can produce per man hour does not change as time goes on), and sector two, which sees productivity grow at a constant compounded rate  (that is, the number of goods workers can produce per man hour grows at a rate , where  is time). To simplify, he assumed that the quantity of goods produced by these two sectors (the "output" of each of the two sectors) is directly proportional to the quantity of labor employed (that is, doubling the number of workers doubles the output, tripling the number of workers triples the output, and so on) and that output depends only upon labor productivity and the quantity of labor. Since there is no increase in labor productivity in sector one, the output of sector one at time  (denoted ) is:

This equation simply says that the amount of output sector one produces equals the number of workers in sector one multiplied by the number of goods each worker can produce. Since productivity does not increase, the number of goods each worker produces remains  and output remains constant through time.

Since the labor productivity of sector two increases at a constant compounded rate , the output of sector two at time  (denoted ) is:

Since productivity grows at a constant compounded rate , the number of goods each worker produces at time  equals , and the output of sector two grows at a rate proportional to productivity growth.

To more clearly demonstrate how wages and costs change through time, wages in both sectors are originally set at the same value . It is then assumed that wages rise in direct proportion to productivity (i.e., a doubling of productivity results in a doubling of wages, a tripling of productivity results in a tripling of wages, and so on). This means that the wages of the two sectors at time  determined solely by productivity are:
 (since productivity remains unchanged), and
 (since productivity increases at a rate )

These values, however, assume that workers do not move between the two sectors. If workers are equally capable of working in either sector, and they choose which sector to work in based upon which offers a higher wage, then they will always choose to work in the sector that offers the higher wage. Firms in sector one are thus forced to raise wages to attract workers. More precisely, in this model the only way firms in either sector can attract workers is to offer the same wage as firms in the other sector—if one sector were to offer lower wages, then all workers would work in the other sector.

So to maintain their workforces, wages in the two sectors must equal each other: . And since it is sector two that sees its wage naturally rise with productivity, while sector one's does not naturally rise, it must be the case that:
.

This typifies the labor aspect of the Baumol effect: as productivity growth in one sector of the economy drives up that sector's wages, firms in sectors without productivity growth must also raise wages to compete for workers.

From this simple model, the consequences on the costs per unit output in the two sectors can be derived. Since the only factor of production within this model is labor, each sector's total cost is the wage paid to workers multiplied by the total number of workers. The cost per unit output is the total cost divided by the amount of output, so with  representing the unit cost of goods in sector one at time  and  representing the unit cost of goods in sector two at time :

 
 

It can be seen that in the sector with growing labor productivity (sector two), the cost per unit output  is constant since both wages and output rise at the same rate. However, in the sector with stagnant labor productivity (sector one), the cost per unit output  rises exponentially since wages rise exponentially faster than output.

This demonstrates the cost aspect of the Baumol effect (the "cost disease"). While costs in sectors with productivity growth—and hence wage growth—need not increase, in sectors with little to no productivity growth (who nonetheless must raise wages to compete for workers) costs necessarily rise. Furthermore, if the productivity growth differential persists (that is, the low-productivity-growth sectors continue to see low productivity growth into the future while high-productivity-growth sectors continue to see high productivity growth), then costs in low-productivity-growth sectors will rise cumulatively and without limit.

Baumol's model can also be used to demonstrate the effect on the distribution of labor. Assume that, despite the change in the relative costs and prices of the two industries, the magnitude of the relative outputs of the two sectors are maintained. A situation similar to this could occur, for instance, "with the aid of government subsidy, or if demand for the product in question were sufficiently price inelastic or income elastic".
 

Letting  (i.e.  is the total labor supply), it follows that:
  or 
 

It can be seen that as  approaches infinity, the quantity of labor in the non-progressive sector  approaches the total labor supply  while the quantity of labor in the progressive sector  approaches zero. Hence, "if the ratio of the outputs of the two sectors is held constant, more and more of the total labor force must be transferred to the non-progressive sector and the amount of labor in the other sector will tend to approach zero".

See also 
 Paradox of toil

Notes

References

External links
 
 
 

Production economics
Inflation
1966 introductions
Health economics